is a Japanese pianist, keyboardist, kotoist, arranger and composer. He recorded three albums with GRP Records: Yutaka (1988), Brazasia (1990), and Another Sun (1993).

He previously recorded an album, Love Light, in 1978 by Alfa Records Japan.  The album received an American release in 1981 on ALFA international America, with the title single, featuring a lead vocal by Patti Austin, reaching #81 on the Billboard Hot 100.

He also recorded his cover version of Donny Hathaway's This Christmas from the GRP All Star Christmas Collection Vol. 1 in 1988.

References

1956 births
20th-century Japanese male musicians
20th-century Japanese pianists
21st-century Japanese male musicians
21st-century Japanese pianists
Japanese jazz composers
Japanese keyboardists
Japanese male composers
Japanese male pianists
Japanese music arrangers
Japanese pianists
Koto players
Living people
Male jazz composers
Male jazz pianists
Smooth jazz pianists